Viktor Eduard Kingissepp ( in Karmel (now ) – 4 May 1922 in Tallinn) was an Estonian communist politician, the leader of the Estonian Communist Party.

The son of a factory worker, he joined a Marxist circle as a schoolboy in Arensburg (now ) (which was renamed Kingissepp in 1952, but was restored to its original Estonian name in 1988), and organised the Estonian section of the Russian Social Democratic Labour Party, in St Petersburg. During the war with Germany, he was put in charge of a medical train on the Western Front. After the February revolution, he returned to Petrograd (as St Petersburg was now named), and joined the Bolsheviks and the Red Guards. After the Bolshevik Revolution, he was deputy chairman of the Estonian Revolutionary Soviet in Reval (now ), but fled back to Petrograd after Estonia was occupied by the German army. He joined the Cheka, and in August 1918 carried out the arrest of Fanny Kaplan, who had shot and attempted to kill Lenin. He returned to Estonia on November 1918 to organise the banned Estonian Communist Party, and presided over its first congress in November 1920. He was arrested by the Estonian Political Police on 3 May 1922, after a mass May Day demonstration in Tallinn, and executed that same night.

Legacy
The Soviet Russian government renamed the town of Yamburg to "Kingisepp" in his honour. An Estonian town Kuressaare on Saaremaa island was also renamed to "Kingissepp" to honour him. Many Estonian towns had their own Viktor Kingiseppa Street during the Soviet era.

References

1888 births
1922 deaths
People from Saaremaa Parish
People from Kreis Ösel
Russian Social Democratic Labour Party members
Old Bolsheviks
Communist Party of Estonia politicians
All-Russian Central Executive Committee members
20th-century executions for treason
People executed for treason against Estonia
Executed Estonian people
Deaths by firearm in Estonia
Executed communists